"D" Train (a.k.a. You're the One for Me) is the debut album by the American urban/post-disco group D-Train, released in United States on 1982 by Prelude Records, and in United Kingdom by Epic Records. The album was remastered by Canadian label Unidisc Music in 1992 including five bonus tracks.

The album was produced by its musical group member Hubert Eaves III.

Track listing
All songs written by Hubert Eaves III and James Williams except where noted.
Side A
 "You're the One for Me" – 4:57
 "Walk On By"  – 5:28
 "Tryin' to Get Over" - 5:26
 "Lucky Day"  – 4:58
Side B
 "'D' Train Theme" – 5:17
 "Keep On" – 6:45
 "Love Vibrations" – 5:19
 "You're the One for Me [Reprise]"  – 3:45

Performers
Lead vocals - James Williams
Bass guitar - Basil Ferrington –  (track 4), Kevin Eaves (track 3)
Drums –  Howard King (tracks 1-4 and 6–8), Hubert Eaves Jr, IV  (track 5)
Electric guitar –   Butch Campbell (track 6), Billy "Spaceman" Paterson (5)
Lisa Fisher – backing vocals (track 5)
Backing vocals, background arrangement – Neil Trotman (track 3)
Cello – Jesse Levy, Seymour Barab
Concertmaster  – Guy Lumia
Strings  – Regis Iandiorio, Marilyn Wright, Marvin Morganstern, Max Ellen, Paul Gershman
Keyboards, vocals, strings arrangement –  Hubert Eaves III
Percussion – Hubert Eaves III, Hubert Eaves Jr, IV (track 1)
Percussion – Steve Kroon

Production
Mastering – Herbie Powers, Jr.
Artwork  Trudy Schlachter
Mixing – François Kevorkian, Hubert Eaves III

Charts

Weekly charts

Year-end charts

Singles

References

External links
 Further information about this album: "D Train" by D-Train on Discogs.

1982 debut albums
D Train (music group) albums